Johanna Konta was the defending champion, but decided not to participate this year.

Jennifer Brady won the title, defeating Olga Govortsova 7–5, 6–2 in the final.

Seeds

Draw

Finals

Top half

Bottom half

References
Main Draw

Challenger Banque Nationale de Granby
Challenger de Granby